The Bayonne Public Library is the free public library of Bayonne, New Jersey. Incorporated in 1890, it serves a population of approximately 62,000.

Carnegie building
The main library is located at 697 Avenue C. The Beaux-Arts and Classical Revival building, sporting Ionic and Doric columns and rich in ornamental detail has undergone expansion and renovation since its 1904 opening. It is one of New Jersey's original thirty-six Carnegie libraries, constructed with a grant of $83,000 made April 13, 1903 by the Carnegie Corporation, still in use. In 1913, Andrew Carnegie donated another $30,000 for its expansion. The present structure was completed after its final expansion at the cost of $300,000. Frank L. Bodine submitted a proposal for the original but the one accepted came from Edward Lippincott Tilton, who also designed the rectangular annex in 1914. Charles Shilowitz designed major addition of the two wings that form a courtyard  built between 1929 and 1933.

In a Memorial Day fire in 1959 the central part of the interior and roof were badly burnt. After a $1.25 million restoration it re-opened to the public in 1963. The building was re-dedicated in 1989 as the Free Public Library & Cultural Center of Bayonne. Performing and visual arts and interactive events take place at The Mary O'Connor Gallery, while the lower level is used for meetings and cultural programs.

Branches and circulation
The Branch Two Library was located at 1055 Avenue C. The Story Court Branch was located in the Bergen Point section of the city at 4th Street. Both branches closed on March 31, 2009. As of 2011, the library system served a population of approximately 62,000 residents, contained a collection of 268,494 volumes and had a yearly circulation of 99,100 items.

In 2022, the library begun using Hoopla, a digital media service.

See also
Bayonne Community Museum
List of Carnegie libraries in New Jersey
National Register of Historic Places listings in Hudson County, New Jersey

References

External links 
Free Public Library and Cultural Center of Bayonne
Bergen County Coopertaive Library System

Library buildings completed in 1904
Carnegie libraries in New Jersey
Buildings and structures in Bayonne, New Jersey
Education in Hudson County, New Jersey
Neoclassical architecture in New Jersey
Beaux-Arts architecture in New Jersey
Public libraries in New Jersey